The International Design school for Advanced Studies (IDAS) is a graduate school affiliated with Hongik University in Seoul. It engages in local design education and research.

History
1996 South Korea's Ministry of Industry and Energy founded the International Design School for Advanced Studies. Since then, a private academy.
2004 merger with Hongik University.

Majors
Digital Media Design (M.Des)
Product Style Design (M.Des)
Style Management (M.Des)
Style Studies (Ph.D)

Degrees
Masters of Style Design
Masters of Style (Digital Media Design)
Masters of Style (Craft Style Design)
Masters of Style (Craft Management)
Doctor of Philosophy (Craft Studies)

External links
 www.academyinfo.go.kr/pubinfo/pubinfo0020/list.do?schlId=0002348&lang=en

 Hongik University website (english)
 Hongik University website (korean)

Design schools
Art schools in South Korea
Hongik University
Educational institutions established in 1996
1996 establishments in South Korea